Nagaland State Disaster Management Authority abbreviated as NSDMA is a government agency, runs under Ministry of Home Affairs (India). It aims to coordinate response to natural or man-made disasters and for capacity-building in disaster resiliency and crisis response in Nagalnd state of India. NSDMA was established in the year 2011 under Home Department, Government of Nagaland.

See also
 National Disaster Response Force
 National Disaster Management Authority (India)

References

External links
 Official website

Government agencies of India
Ministry of Home Affairs (India)
Organisations based in Delhi
Government agencies established in 2005
Emergency management in India